Annemarie Eilfeld (born 2 May 1990), also known as Annemie, is a German singer and songwriter, best known as a former contestant of Deutschland sucht den Superstar, the German version of the Idols franchise. She released her first single "Animal Instinct" in May 2010.

Early life
Eilfeld is the daughter of a music teacher and an estate agent. In her early childhood, her family moved from Wittenberg to Dessau-Roßlau. At the age of seven, she began an education in music and dance. Over the following years, she took part in various local song contests.

Career
In 2004, Eilfeld participated in Germany's casting show Star Search 2 and qualified for the finals. This was closely followed by her debut single "C the Light" (Edel Music), which appeared under the name "Anne Marie".

Between 2005 and 2008, she occasionally performed on stage with different local bands.

Deutschland sucht den Superstar
In 2009's casting show Deutschland sucht den Superstar (DSDS), broadcast on RTL, Eilfeld made it to the top three. In contrast to the generally negative views of the jury, the German tabloid Bild supported Eilfeld, who was pushed into the role of a "super-bitch" throughout the show. Due to contractual agreements, Eilfeld has had to take a three-month break from publishing new music, like all former DSDS contestants.

DSDS performances

Post-DSDS
Since June 2009, Eilfeld has acted in guest appearances on Germany's popular soap opera Gute Zeiten, schlechte Zeiten ("Good Times, Bad Times"). She has also been touring Germany with her band LaMie, which she founded in 2008.

On 1 September 2009, Eilfeld signed with German record label X-Cell Records and got a management contract with Artist Advice, company of producer George Glueck.

On 14 May 2010, Eilfeld released her single "Animal Instinct" under her new pseudonym "Annemie". The music video premiered on VIVA NEU and YouTube, where it was met with good reviews.

Discography

Singles

Albums

Other songs 
 2004: "C the Light"
 2009: "Moon and Sun"

References

External links 

Eilfeld's official website
Eilfeld's official Universal Music website
Performing "Animal Instinct" at ZDF-Fernsehgarten, May 16, 2010

1990 births
Living people
Deutschland sucht den Superstar participants
Eilfeld, Annemarie
21st-century German women singers